Wallace E. Nield (April 1, 1889 – December 27, 1950) was an American farmer and politician.

Born in Racine, Wisconsin, Nield served in the United States Army during World War I. He took a business course. Nield was a farmer and shipped farm produce. He served on the Racine County, Wisconsin Board of Supervisors and was the clerk of the North Racine School. Nield served in the Wisconsin State Assembly in 1947. Initially a Democrat, he later became a Republican. He died in Racine, Wisconsin.

Notes

1889 births
1950 deaths
Politicians from Racine, Wisconsin
Military personnel from Wisconsin
Farmers from Wisconsin
School board members in Wisconsin
County supervisors in Wisconsin
20th-century American politicians
Democratic Party members of the Wisconsin State Assembly
Republican Party members of the Wisconsin State Assembly